Nechayevo is a rural locality (a selo) in Korochansky District, Belgorod Oblast, Russia. The population was 344 as of 2010. There are 11 streets.

Geography 
Nechayevo is located 16 km south of Korocha (the district's administrative centre) by road. Tyurino is the nearest rural locality.

References 

Rural localities in Korochansky District
Korochansky Uyezd